Deccani literature The literature was produced in Deccani dialect of Urdu language writing system. The earliest forms of Deccani literature are in the form of Sufi and Bhakti texts with poetic genres. The timeline of Deccani literature is divided into two periods: medieval (1300-1800) and modern (after 1800). Though Medieval Deccani literature consists of Mathnawi it also has various genres, including works of "Fakhruddin Nizami" Kadam Rao Padam Rao (1434 AD), Deccani Masnavi originated during the Bahmani Sultanate of Deccan (now South India) in the early 14th and 15th century; they are written in rhyming couplets in Deccani Urdu, the use of grammar and meter are similar with Masnavi of Urdu language. 

In the late 15th and early 16th century, after the Bahmani Sultanate disintegrated into the Deccan Sultanates. The Deccani literary tradition was largely developed and became concentrated at Golconda and Bijapur. Numerous Deccani poets were patronized during this time. According to Shaheen and Shahid, Golconda was the literary home of Asadullah Wajhi (author of Sab Ras), ibn-e-Nishati (Phulban), and Ghwasi (Tutinama). Bijapur played host to Hashmi Bijapuri, San‘ati, and Mohammed Nusrati over the years. The rulers themselves participated in these cultural developments. Muhammad Quli Qutb Shah of the Golconda Sultanate wrote poetry in Deccani, which was compiled into a Kulliyat. It is widely considered to be the earliest Deccani Urdu poetry of a secular nature. and Lazzat Un Nisa, a book compiled in the 16th century at Qutb Shahi courts contains secret medicines and stimulants in the eastern form of ancient sexual arts. Ibrahim Adil Shah II of the Bijapur Sultanate produced Kitab-e-Navras (Book of the Nine Rasas), a work of musical poetry written entirely in Deccani. In 18the century a collection of Urdu Ghazal poetry, named Gulzar-e-Mahlaqa, authored by Mah Laqa Bai—the first female Urdu poet to produce a Diwan—was published in Hyderabad.

References

Bibliography 
 
 

Urdu-language literature
Early Modern literature
Languages of India